Agnieszka Ewa Dziemianowicz-Bąk (born 20 January 1984) is a Polish left-wing social activist and politician. She has been a member of the Sejm since 2019.

Political career
Between December 2015 and February 2019, Dziemianowicz-Bąk was a member of the National Board of the Razem (Together) party. She represented Razem in the Democracy in Europe Movement 2025 (DiEM25) pan-European organisation.

In 2016, Foreign Policy magazine included Dziemianowicz-Bąk, together with Barbara Nowacka, on its annual list of the 100 most influential global thinkers for their role in organising the "black protest" against a total ban on abortion in Poland.

In February 2019, she left the Razem party due to disagreements over party strategy in then-upcoming elections to the European Parliament. In August 2019, she was elected to the Coordinating Collective of DiEM25.

Dziemianowicz-Bąk was elected to the Sejm on 13 October 2019, receiving 14,257 votes in the Wrocław district, campaigning from The Left list.

Aside from protesting abortion laws, Dziemianowicz-Bąk has also been active in protests for LGBT rights. In September 2020, she won the Equality Crowns award for politics from Campaign Against Homophobia. She said that she wished such an award was not necessary.

References 

1984 births
Living people
Left Together politicians
Politicians from Wrocław
Members of the Polish Sejm 2019–2023
Polish socialist feminists
Women members of the Sejm of the Republic of Poland
21st-century Polish women politicians
Polish abortion-rights activists
Polish LGBT rights activists